The Oriel (also known as The Oriel of Gilford) was a restaurant in Gilford, County Down, Northern Ireland. It was a fine dining restaurant that was awarded one Michelin star in both 2004 and 2005.

In 2005 the restaurant also gained recognition of the Egon Ronay Guide. The Guide listed it as one of the 25 best restaurants in the United Kingdom. The restaurant closed down in 2006. The head chef of The Oriel was Barry Smyth.

See also
List of Michelin starred restaurants in Ireland

References 

2002 establishments in Northern Ireland
2006 disestablishments in Northern Ireland
Defunct restaurants in Ireland
Defunct restaurants in the United Kingdom
Michelin Guide starred restaurants in Ireland
Restaurants in Northern Ireland
Restaurants established in 2002
Restaurants disestablished in 2006